Daniel Welbat (born 7 May 1989 in Hamburg, Germany) alias WellBad (coinage: Well+Bad), is a German blues rock musician and soundtrack composer.

Life 
Daniel Welbat is the son of the German producer Douglas Welbat and the actress Katja Brügger. WellBad had recorded his first own songs when he was 16 years old. He was 20 years old when he founded the label Blue Central Records, together with his cousin. His models were Willie Dixon, The Black Keys, Eels and Tom Waits.

WellBad composed the soundtrack to the 2010 produced German film Vater Morgana. The records were made in the Hafenklang-Studios in Hamburg.
He contributed in audio drama productions, music projects, worked as an actor and directed films and wrote screenplays for short movies.

Discography

EP 
 2010: Better Days (CD, Blue Central Records OHG)

Albums 
 2011: beautiful disaster (CD, Blue Central Records OHG)

Soundtracks 
 2010: Vater Morgana [Soundtrack] (Blue Central Records OHG)

Filmography 
 2004: Kleider machen Leute (short film); director and screenplay
 2009: Wittich (pilot broadcast); director, soundtrack
 2010: Vater Morgana; soundtrack
 2010: ''Die Drei Fragezeichen

References

External links

 
 
 Daniel Welbad at filmportal.de
 Website of the Band
 Daniel Welbat Lesung in der St. Gertrudkirche in Hamburg

1989 births
German male musicians
Living people